Toronto Ukrainian Genealogy Group (TUGG) is a non-profit cultural and educational organization located in Toronto, Ontario, Canada, which pursues research into the genealogical roots of Ukrainian Canadians.

TUGG operates out of the St Vladimir Institute, which is located at 620 Spadina Avenue, in Toronto.

Members include people interested in tracing their ancestry, locating missing relatives, finding the origin and meaning of their last names and gaining an overall knowledge of Ukrainian genealogy, heraldry, culture, ethnicity, geography and history.

TUGG provides lectures and assistance to its members, as well as undertaking research in the field of Ukrainian genealogy. TUGG has also gained access to the newly opened archives in Ukraine after the fall of the Soviet Union.

The organization publishes a quarterly newsletter about Ukrainian genealogy and maintains a library of related publications, as well as networking with other genealogical groups.

See also
 Ukrainian Canadian
 Toronto Ukrainians

Ukrainian genealogy
Ukrainian-Canadian culture in Ontario